Bark painting is an Australian Aboriginal art form, involving painting on the interior of a strip of tree bark. This is a continuing form of artistic expression in Arnhem Land (especially among the Yolngu peoples) and other regions in the Top End of Australia, including parts of the Kimberley region of Western Australia. Traditionally, bark paintings were produced for instructional and ceremonial purposes and were transient objects. Today, they are keenly sought after by collectors and public arts institutions.

Origin
The designs seen on authentic bark paintings are traditional designs that are owned by the artist, or his "skin", or his clan, and cannot be painted by other artists. In many cases these designs would traditionally be used to paint the body for ceremonies or rituals, and also to decorate logs used in burials ceremonies. While the designs themselves are ancient, the medium of painting them on a piece of flattened bark is a relatively modern phenomenon, although there is some evidence that artists would paint designs on the bark walls and roofs of their shelters.

The earliest surviving bark paintings date from the nineteenth century, an example of which is a bark etching of a kangaroo hunt now in the British Museum, which was collected near Boort in northern Victoria by the British explorer John Hunter Kerr. The modern form of bark paintings first appeared in the 1930s, when missionaries at Yirrkala and Milingimbi asked the local Yolngu people to produce bark paintings that could be sold in the cities of New South Wales and Victoria. The motives of the missionaries were to earn money that would help pay for the mission, and also to educate white Australians about Yolngu culture (Morphy 1991). As the trade grew, and the demand for paintings increased, leading artists such as Narritjin Maymuru started being asked to mount exhibitions.

It was, however, not until the 1980s that bark paintings started being regarded as fine art, as opposed to an interesting Indigenous handicraft, and commanded high prices accordingly on the international art markets. Nowadays, the value of a fine bark painting depends not only on the skill and fame of the artist, and on the quality of the art itself, but also on the degree to which the artwork encapsulates the culture by telling a traditional story.

Manufacture
The barest necessities for bark artwork are paint, brushes, bark, fixative and a fire.

The material of choice is the bark from Stringybark (Eucalyptus tetradonta). The bark must be free of knots and other blemishes. It is best cut from the tree in the wet season when the sap is rising. Two horizontal slices and a single vertical slice are made into the tree, and the bark is carefully peeled off with the aid of a sharpened tool. Only the inner smooth bark is kept and placed in a fire. After heating in the fire, the bark is flattened under foot and weighted with stones or logs to dry flat. Once dry, it is ready to paint upon.

Earth pigments—or ochres—in red, yellow and black are used, also mineral oxides of iron and manganese and white pipeclay, or calcium carbonate. Ochres may be fixed with a binder such as PVA glue, or previously, with the sap or juice of plants such as orchid bulbs.

After the painting is completed, the bark is splinted at either end to keep the painting flat. A fixative, traditionally orchid juice, is added over the top.

Interpretation

Bark paintings are based on sacred designs that include abstract patterns and designs (such as cross-hatching in particular colours) that identify a clan, and also often contain elements of the Eternal Dreamtime. Sometimes the elements of a story are obvious—such as men or animals—but sometimes the elements are symbolic. What appears to the tourist as a series of wavy lines punctuated by dots may actually be telling a complex Dreaming story describing the path of a creator spirit and events that happened along the way.

An uninitiated man or woman is only allowed to paint outside stories, the sort of story that might be told to a child. An initiated man can paint an inside story, which is restricted knowledge. Thus, a painting may be displayed in an exhibition, or put up for sale, but the artist, although having the right to paint the story, does not have the right to tell the story to another person. Alternatively, the story behind the painting may be one that may not be told to an uninitiated person. As buyers often want a story to go with the painting, this puts the artist in an unenviable position. The buyer may therefore receive a watered-down or distorted version of the story.

Most of the following is based on Morphy (1991), where far more detail may be found, and refers specifically to the Yolngu paintings from Yirrkala, although the same principles generally apply elsewhere.

Non-indigenous people who, like Morphy, have spent years studying the subject, still have an outsider's view and rely analogies. The Yolngu language and culture has words and concepts that are unfamiliar to non-indigenous cultures, which makes understanding the art form difficult. The following explanation only describes the physical aspects.

A bark painting consists of several components, not all of which may be present in an individual painting, and that are generally applied in the following order:
 Ground
 Border
 Dividing Lines
 Feature Blocks
 Figurative designs
 geometric designs
 Clan designs
 Cross-hatching

Ground
In all cases, the bark is first covered with a layer of ochre, which is usually red or white, occasionally yellow, and rarely black.

Border
The border, if present, is usually yellow. When Donald Thomson first came to Yirrkala in 1933, only paintings with clan designs had borders. Nowadays, borders may be found on any type of painting.

Dividing lines and feature blocks
A painting is often divided into several distinct sections (or "feature blocks") by a series of dividing lines. Each feature block can be regarded as a complete composition, distinct from the other feature blocks. Sometimes different feature blocks depict different scenes in a story, and the painting as a whole tells the whole story.

Figurative designs
Figurative designs resemble a real (or mythological) object or being. Thus, a figurative design of a possum “looks like” a possum, as opposed to being an abstract symbol for a possum, which is recognisable only to someone familiar with this symbolism. Most commercially available bark paintings contain recognisable figurative designs that often tells a traditional story.

Geometric designs
Geometric designs are representational symbols, and their meaning often depends on context and on who painted the painting. The same symbol can also have different meanings. For example, a circle might represent a water hole, a campsite, a mat, a campfire, a nut, an egg, a hole left by maggots, etc., depending on context. Yolngu culture takes a holistic view of the world, in which these meanings may not be so very different after all. Morphy gives the example of a circle and a line, which a non-initiate is told represents a “kangaroo water hole”, and depicts a water hole with a creek running into it. At a later ceremony, when he says he knows it's a “kangaroo water hole”, he is told “That water hole was made by the old man kangaroo digging in the ground with his tail to make a well for water, using his tail as a digging stick”. Later, he is told an even more complex story involving a female kangaroo. (See Morphy for the detailed story.)

Clan designs
Unlike the previous components of the painting, Clan designs are sacred and initially did not appear on public paintings, although nowadays they can be seen on commercial paintings. A clan design may consist of a combination of symbols, geometric designs, and cross hatching, One clan symbol, for example, consists of a series of interlocking diamonds painted in particular colours, whilst another includes symbols of a “sugar-bag” (wild honey). A Yolngu person can immediately identify the clan and moiety of the painter from that design, which then also provides further context for interpreting the symbolism of the geometric designs.

Cross-hatching (rarrk)

Cross-hatching, or rarrk, is perhaps one of the most distinctive features of Yolngu art of north-eastern Arnhem Land. Closely spaced parallel fine lines are drawn, intersecting each other. Traditionally it is done on bark, using grass, although artists also use the technique on modern art materials and brushes are almost always used. Artists using the rarrk technique often blend traditional themes or influences, using the traditional colours, restricted to black and white and red ochre and yellow ochre. Many Kunwinjku artists also employ rarrk, including John Mawurndjul and Peter Marralwanga.

A sub-style of rarrk, known as x-ray art, shows part of the internal organs of the animals in the painting.

Subject material
The content depicted by the painting is often either a traditional Dreaming story or a map. Sometimes it will be both, because the ancestral stories and songs often refer to the paths of creation ancestors as they travel across the land (see songlines). Morphy gives an example of a painting that depicts a particular ancestral journey, but also shows where an airstrip was built.

Notable Aboriginal bark painters
Notable bark painters include:
Narritjin Maymuru 
Yirawala
John Mawurndjul
Djawa
Djambawa Murawilli
George Milpurrurru
Binyinyuwuy Djarrankuykuy
Mungurrawuy Yunupingu
Paddy Dhathangu
Wandjuk Marika (also a noted didgeridoo player)
Lofty Bardayal Nadjamerrek
Bobby Barrdjaray Nganjmirra
Nonggirrnga Marawili
Nyapanyapa Yunupingu
Gulumbu Yunupingu
Jimmy Wululu

See also
Buku-Larrnggay Mulka Centre
Yirrkala bark petitions

References

External links

Aboriginal Art - Bark paintings
Telstra National Aboriginal & Torres Strait Islander Art Awards.
Buku-Larrnggay Mulka Art Centre and Museum in Yirrkala 
the YBE art centre near Nhulunbuy
Injalak Arts and Crafts Centre in Gunbalanya (Oenpelli)
Aboriginal Fine Art Gallery

Australian Aboriginal art
Painting techniques